Shek Kip Mei Park is an urban park located in Shek Kip Mei, Hong Kong near an area noted for its temporary housing built on a hillside. It is one of the largest parks in Sham Shui Po.

Facilities
There is an indoor sports centre with a fitness room, activity rooms, and a children playroom.

Amenities include an outdoor artificial climbing wall, tennis courts, children's playground, fountain, artificial waterfall, amphitheatre, mini-soccer pitch with colour-coated hard surface, two colour-coated basketball courts, jogging track with fitness stations and a rest garden.

There is a natural grass rugby-cum-soccer pitch with a 1,446 person capacity spectator stand.

See also
 Shek Kip Mei Estate
 List of urban public parks and gardens in Hong Kong

External links

 Shek Kip Mei Park

Urban public parks and gardens in Hong Kong
Shek Kip Mei